Friedrich Ferdinand, Duke of Schleswig-Holstein-Sonderburg-Glücksburg, then Friedrich Ferdinand, Duke of Schleswig-Holstein (12 October 1855 – 21 January 1934), was the fourth Duke of Schleswig-Holstein-Sonderburg-Glücksburg and became the fifth Duke of Schleswig-Holstein in 1931.

Family and succession
Friedrich Ferdinand was born in Kiel, Duchy of Holstein, the eldest son of Friedrich, Duke of Schleswig-Holstein-Sonderburg-Glücksburg and Princess Adelheid of Schaumburg-Lippe and a nephew of Christian IX of Denmark. Friedrich Ferdinand succeeded to the headship of the House of Schleswig-Holstein-Sonderburg-Glücksburg and title duke upon the death of his father on 27 November 1885. When the Head of the House of Schleswig-Holstein-Sonderburg-Augustenburg Albert, Duke of Schleswig-Holstein died on 27 April 1931, Friedrich Ferdinand became the Head of the House of Oldenburg and inherited the title Duke of Schleswig-Holstein.

Marriage and issue
Friedrich Ferdinand married Princess Karoline Mathilde of Schleswig-Holstein-Sonderburg-Augustenburg, daughter of Frederick VIII, Duke of Schleswig-Holstein-Sonderburg-Augustenburg and his wife Princess Adelheid of Hohenlohe-Langenburg, on 19 March 1885 at Primkenau. Friedrich Ferdinand and Karoline Mathilde had six children:

 Princess Viktoria Adelheid Helene Luise Marie Friederike of Schleswig-Holstein-Sonderburg-Glücksburg (31 December 1885 – 3 October 1970)
 Princess Alexandra Viktoria Auguste Leopoldine Charlotte Amalie Wilhelmine of Schleswig-Holstein-Sonderburg-Glücksburg (21 April 1887 – 15 April 1957)
 Princess Helene Adelheid Viktoria Marie of Schleswig-Holstein-Sonderburg-Glücksburg (1 June 1888 – 30 June 1962)
 Princess Adelheid Luise of Schleswig-Holstein-Sonderburg-Glücksburg (19 October 1889 – 11 June 1964)
 Wilhelm Friedrich Christian Günther Albert Adolf Georg, Duke of Schleswig-Holstein (23 August 1891 – 10 February 1965)
 Princess Karoline Mathilde of Schleswig-Holstein-Sonderburg-Glücksburg (11 May 1894 – 28 January 1972)

Death
Friedrich Ferdinand died in 1934 at Hause Eckernförde close to Güby in Schleswig-Holstein, Germany aged 78.

Honours
He received the following orders and decorations:
  Duchy of Anhalt: Grand Cross of Albert the Bear, 1886
 : Knight of the Elephant, 8 April 1876
    Ernestine duchies: Grand Cross of the Saxe-Ernestine House Order
  Kingdom of Greece: Grand Cross of the Redeemer
 : Grand Cross of the Order of Duke Peter Friedrich Ludwig, with Golden Crown and Collar
  Kingdom of Prussia:
 Knight of the Red Eagle, 1st Class, 22 March 1886; Grand Cross, 7 September 1890
 Knight of the Black Eagle, 24 December 1892; with Collar, 17 January 1893
 : Honorary Grand Cross of the Royal Victorian Order, 11 October 1905
 : Grand Cross of the Württemberg Crown, 1877

Ancestry

References

Princes of Schleswig-Holstein-Sonderburg-Glücksburg
Members of the Prussian House of Lords
1855 births
1934 deaths
Nobility from Kiel
Generals of Cavalry (Prussia)
Honorary Knights Grand Cross of the Royal Victorian Order